Volujak ( or Valljake) is the name of a hamlet in Kosovo. There is peak 40 km to the west also called Volujak, or Maja e Vjelakut.

References

 

Accursed Mountains
Villages in Klina